The Structural Engineering Association of Alaska (SEAAK) is a professional society of structural engineers in Alaska established in 2007. It is a member organization of the National Council of Structural Engineers Associations.

SEAAK meets regularly in Anchorage, AK and has members throughout Alaska.

Members of SEAAK played a critical role in the recovery effort following the 2018 M7.1 Anchorage Earthquake. Alaskan structural engineers were conducting post-earthquake damage assessments within minutes of the event and continued to provide inspections and repairs over the next few months.

See also
 National Council of Structural Engineers Associations

References

External links
 

American engineering organizations
Structural engineering
Professional associations based in the United States